The South Wales Main Line, originally known as the London, Bristol and South Wales Direct Railway or simply as the Bristol and South Wales Direct Railway, is a branch of the Great Western Main Line in Great Britain. It diverges from the core London-Bristol line at Royal Wootton Bassett beyond Swindon, first calling at Bristol Parkway, after which the line continues through the Severn Tunnel into South Wales.

Great Western Railway operates Class 800 trains between London and South Wales, and "Castle class" High Speed Trains on services between Cardiff and South West England. CrossCountry provides services from Cardiff to Nottingham via Severn Tunnel Junction and thence the Gloucester to Newport Line via Gloucester and Birmingham. Transport for Wales operates services between South Wales, and North Wales and the Midlands on the line.

The line between Swindon and Cardiff Central was electrified using the 25 kV AC overhead system as part of the larger electrification of the Great Western Main Line.

History
The original route of the Great Western Railway (GWR) between London and South Wales, after the opening of Brunel's Chepstow Railway Bridge in 1852, left the Bristol-bound Great Western Main Line at Swindon, proceeding via Stroud, Gloucester and Chepstow before rejoining the present line at Severn Tunnel Junction. This gave rise to the nickname 'Great Way Round'.

In 1886, the opening of the Severn Tunnel brought the opportunity of a more direct route to South Wales, and trains from Swindon to Newport and beyond were routed via Bath, Bristol and the tunnel.

The route used today was established in 1903 with the building of what is often known as the Badminton Line. The new line left the Bath line beyond Swindon at what is now Royal Wootton Bassett, rejoining the earlier route north of Bristol near Patchway. Not only did this provide a more direct route for traffic to and from South Wales, the gradients were easier for coal trains to negotiate, and it was thought that the line would be a boost to what was, at the time of building, the expanding port of Fishguard. This was the GWR's connection with trans-Atlantic ocean liner departures.

21st century 
In 2005, the Strategic Rail Authority produced a Route Utilisation Strategy for the Great Western Main Line in 2005 to propose ways of meeting increased traffic levels.

Reading station underwent a major redevelopment, being reopened in July 2014.

Electrification

The South Wales Main Line was one of the last of the major inter-city routes in Great Britain to remain un-electrified.  The government announced in 2012 a scheme to electrify the South Wales Main Line as part of a wider scheme of electrification on the Great Western Main Line. The line from London to Cardiff was fully electrified by Christmas 2019.

The Hitachi Super Express trains bought for Great Western inter-city services are predominantly electric units, but a portion of the fleet are dual power source electro-diesel bi-mode trains, which enabled services to operate before line electrification is complete. The bi-mode trains will allow inter-city services to continue to operate from London all the way to Carmarthen in the future. The Super Express trains were expected to bring an estimated 15% increase in capacity during the morning peak hours.  Electrification cut journey times between Swansea and London by an estimated 20 minutes, although electrification will not extend west of Cardiff to Swansea, Carmarthen or Pembroke Dock, and services on the line to Brighton, Portsmouth Harbour and Taunton will continue to be operated by diesel trains, as the Bristol to Exeter Line and the Wessex Main Line will not be electrified.

Infrastructure

There are four tracks from Severn Tunnel Junction through Newport to Cardiff Central, with two tracks on the remaining sections. Multiple-aspect signals are controlled from several power signal boxes including Swindon, Bristol and two in Cardiff. Over the August Bank Holiday weekend 2016, control of the signals between Westerleigh Junction and Pilning was switched over to the Thames Valley Signalling Centre. These signals now carry the prefix 'BL'.

Associated routes
A diversionary route exists if the Severn Tunnel is closed. This takes trains from Severn Tunnel Junction to Gloucester, from where they can rejoin the main line either via the Golden Valley Line to Swindon, or take the Cross-Country Route and reverse at Bristol Parkway.

The local service between Swansea and Cardiff is branded Swanline. The urban network within and surrounding Cardiff, including the Maesteg Line, is referred to as Valley Lines.

Communities served

Towns and cities served by trains from London
 Reading
 Didcot
 Swindon
 Bristol
 Newport
 Cardiff
 Bridgend
 Port Talbot
 Neath
 Swansea

Settlements served by local trains only
 Patchway
 Pilning (very limited service)
 Magor
 Rogiet
 Llanharan
 Pontyclun
 Pencoed
 Pyle
 Baglan
 Briton Ferry
 Skewen
 Llansamlet

Accidents and incidents
On 7 March 2015, Battle of Britain-class locomotive 34067 Tangmere was hauling a charter train that overran a signal at Wooton Bassett, Wiltshire. The train's operator, West Coast Railway Company was banned from running trains on the British railway network as a direct consequence of this incident.

See also
 Transport in Wales
 Transport in England
 South Wales Railway
 Great Western Main Line

References

External links

 2007 Business Plan, Network Rail, London

 
Rail transport in Bridgend County Borough
Rail transport in Bristol
Rail transport in Cardiff
Rail transport in Neath Port Talbot
Rail transport in Newport, Wales
Rail transport in Rhondda Cynon Taf
Rail transport in Swansea
Rail transport in Wiltshire
Railway lines opened in 1903
Railway lines in South West England
Railway lines in Wales
Standard gauge railways in England
Standard gauge railways in Wales